The 37 mm Automatic Gun, M4, known as the T9 during development, was a 37 mm (1.46 in) recoil-operated autocannon designed by Browning Arms Company. The weapon, which was built by Colt, entered service in 1942. It was primarily mounted in the Bell P-39 Airacobra and P-63 Kingcobra, with the U.S. Navy also utilizing it on many PT boats.

Design

It was magazine-fed and could be fired manually or by remote control through a solenoid mounted on the rear of the gun.

Recoil and counter-recoil were controlled hydraulically by means of a piston and spring combination connected to the recoiling mechanism and operating in an oil-filled recuperator cylinder mounted to the stationary trunnion block assembly. The recoiling mechanism of the gun included the tube and tube extension, recuperator piston and piston rod, lock frame assembly, driving spring assemblies, and the breechblock assembly. The nonrecoiling parts included the trunnion block group, the feed box and feeding mechanism, the recuperator cylinder and bushing, the back plate group, and the manual charger assembly.

Feeding mechanism
As the gun was originally designed, ammunition could be fed by a 5-round clip, a 15-round link belt, or a non-disintegrating 30-round endless belt magazine. The 30-round endless belt version was used exclusively in production. The M4 gun fed only from the left.

The 30-round endless belt magazine was given the designation M6; it had an oval-shaped framework (nicknamed a "horsecollar magazine" from its shape) providing a track for the endless belt.

Firing cycle
Initial loading and cocking of the gun were accomplished manually. A safety feature incorporated in the design of the trigger mechanism prevented firing the round until the breech-block assembly was in the battery position.

The breech was locked and unlocked by recoil action which brings the operating level guide pins against cams to raise and lower the breechblock. The function of the breechblock was to assist in the final chambering of the round, close the breech, and actuate the trigger trip. It also provided a mounting for the firing pin.

The lock frame was retracted by recoil action during automatic firing and is forced forward by the driving springs. The major function of the lock frame assembly was to force the cartridge into the chamber, actuate the breech block, fire the round by means of the hammer striking the firing pin, extract the cartridge case from the chamber, and operate the ejector.

The back plate assembly, by absorbing the energy of the lock frame, reduced the shock against the carrier pin as the lock frame was hatched to the rear.

The driving spring assemblies held the lock frame against the carrier dog until the carrier was released by carrier catch which was pivoted by the incoming round. The springs then drove the lock frame assembly forward to operate the ejector, chamber the round and raise the breech block.

Initial extraction occurred during recoil. Extraction, ejection, feeding and loading were accomplished during counter-recoil. If the trigger was held in the firing position, the gun would continue to fire automatically until the magazine was empty.

US Army Air Forces

The 37 mm cannon was disliked by pilots for its low muzzle velocity, resulting in more pronounced drop than other contemporary weapons.

The only standard aircraft armed with the M4 to see service were the Bell P-39 Airacobra and the derivative P-63 Kingcobra. It was used as a limited standard aircraft in North Africa and the Pacific theater by the USAAF and Allied air forces.

Some YP-38s, the prototype model of the P-38 Lightning, mounted a single M4 before the armament scheme was finalized. Production Lightning models would replace the M4 with the AN/M2 20 mm cannon.

The experimental XP-58 "Chain Lightning" was a larger, more heavily armed version of the P-38 Lightning equipped with quadruple M4 cannons instead of M2 heavy machine guns in its nose. Its original purpose (like the German Bf 110) was to destroy formations of bombers, but it was later re-envisioned as a ground-attack plane. The more pronounced ballistic trajectory was unfamiliar for American pilots, and the four M4s were replaced with a single 75mm M5 cannon and a pair of .50 caliber heavy machine guns.

The first US jet, the P-59 Airacomet, mounted a single M4 cannon in the nose, along with three .50 caliber machine guns.

US Navy

The M4 37 mm (1.46 in) automatic cannon was mounted on numerous U.S. Navy PT boats as deck guns, beginning with the Solomon Islands campaign. Primary targets were the landing barges being used to move supplies down the island chain at night. At first, they were cannibalized from crashed P-39s at Henderson Field, and due to their success as an anti-barge weapon were used for the rest of the war. The M4s were initially mounted on a simple pedestal mount (often built at the front lines) with the standard horseshoe endless-belt feed being used. Later, an improved pedestal mount was designed for original equipment mountings on the boats. Handgrips of several configurations were used with various sights being tried.  Most PT boat gunners used tracers to sight the fall of their shot. Beginning in 1944, the M9 model 37 mm (1.46 in) cannon was installed at the builders' boatyard as standard equipment.

Soviet Air Forces
During World War II the United States supplied the Soviet Air Forces with the M4-equipped P-39 Airacobra and P-63 King Cobra. The U.S did not supply M80 armor-piercing rounds for these Lend-Lease aircraft—instead, the Soviets received 1,232,991 M54 high-explosive rounds. The M4 was sometimes employed against soft ground targets on the Eastern Front but was primarily used in air-to-air combat, in which role it was highly effective. The Soviets did not use the P-39 for tank-busting. Soviet pilots appreciated the M4's reliability but complained of its low rate of fire (three rounds per second) and small magazine size (30 rounds).

US-built contemporaries and successors
 The 37 mm M9 autocannon was a derivative of the 37 mm M1A2 flak gun and used the longer, more powerful 37×223mmSR cartridge. Compared to the M4, the M9 had 50% more muzzle velocity (3,000 fps) from a 78-inch barrel (vs. 65-inch in M4), and was twice as heavy (120 vs. 55 pounds for the barrel alone); the whole M9 weighed 405 pounds vs. 213 of the M4. The cyclic rate was the same. Little is known about this gun's deployment; the only confirmed use is in the US Navy PT boats mentioned above.
 The 37 mm M10 autocannon was a minor improvement of the M4. It was fed by metallic disintegrating link belt and had a slightly higher rate of fire at around 165 rpm. The M10 replaced the M4 in aircraft starting with the A-9 model of the Bell P-63 Kingcobra. The disintegrating link belt made it possible to increase ammunition storage in the Bell P-63 Kingcobra from 30 rounds to 58 rounds.

See also
 List of U.S. Army weapons by supply catalog designation
 COW 37 mm gun: earlier British equivalent
 M4 carbine

Weapons of comparable role, performance and era
 Nudelman-Suranov NS-37 (Nudelman N-37): Soviet equivalents
 Vickers S gun: 40mm British equivalent
 Bordkanone BK 3,7: German equivalent
 Ho-203 cannon: Japanese equivalent

Notes

References
 War Department, U.S. Army Coast Artillery Corps, Training Manual TM-9-2300 Standard Artillery and Fire Control Materiel (7 February 1944)
 War Department, Training Manual TM 9-240 37-mm Aircraft Gun Materiel M4 (30 March 1942)
 War Department, Training Manual TM 9-1240 37-mm Automatic Gun M4 (Anti-aircraft) (3 January 1942)
 War Department, US Army Ordnance Corps, Standard Nomenclature List Catalog, Group A, Subgroup A46 ORD SNL A-46 (37mm Gun, Automatic, models M4 & M10)
 P-63 KingCobra - Browning M4 37mm Auto Cannon Gun
 United States of America 7 mm/56 (1.46") M4

External links
 

37 mm artillery
Aircraft guns
Autocannon